Ján Ďurčo (born 25 February 1988) is a Slovak football goalkeeper who currently plays for Dukla Banská Bystrica.

External links

 at official club website 

1988 births
Living people
Slovak footballers
FK Dukla Banská Bystrica players
FK Dubnica players
MFK Tatran Liptovský Mikuláš players
FK Železiarne Podbrezová players
Association football goalkeepers
Slovak Super Liga players
People from Partizánske
Sportspeople from the Trenčín Region